Arturs Neiksans (born 16 March 1983) is a Latvian chess player who has held the FIDE title of Grandmaster since 2012. He is a four-time Latvian champion, one of the leading Latvian chess players, an FIDE-accredited chess trainer, author and a commentator of high-level chess tournaments.

Biography 
Born in Valka (a small Latvian bordertown with Estonia), Neiksans started to play chess relatively late for an eventual grandmaster, being 9 years old upon learning the game. At age 16, he received the title of a national master, and at age 18 has was ranked as an international master. In 1999, being only 16 years old, Neiksans won the Latvian Chess Championship, thus becoming the youngest-ever Latvian champion. He beat Mikhail Tal's record, which was set in 1953, by several months.

After graduating from high school, Neiksans essentially left competitive chess, and after receiving an MBA Master's degree in Public Relations, he mostly worked in the field of communications, most notably the Latvian Ministry of Education and Science. He later also worked at the newspaper Jelgavas Vestnesis. At age 27, he was offered the position of head chess coach in the Riga Chess School. He continued the interrupted work of the legendary Latvian grandmaster Janis Klovans, who had just died at the age of 75. Every day,  Neiksans, who was still an IM at the time, would work on his chess. He needed slightly more than one year to get all of the required three grandmaster norms, thus getting the coveted title at the age of 28, which for professional chess players is considered to be quite late. In 2012, he received the FIDE trainer's title as well, and in 2016, his ELO rating peaked at 2631.

Personal achievements 

 Four-time Latvian champion (1999, 2011, 2015, 2019)
 Summer Chess Classic C tournament, USA – 1st place (2019)
 Ilmar Raud Memorial, Estonia – 1st place (2015, 2020)
 President's 2nd Cup, Riga – 1st place (2019)
 RTU Open 2016 A tournament, Riga – shared 1st place, 3rd in tiebreaks (2016)
 Liepājas Rokāde 2016, super tournament, Liepāja – shared 1st place, 2nd in tiebreaks
 5th Vladimir Petrov memorial, Jūrmala shared 1st place with Vasyl Ivanchuk, Loek van Wely and Alexander Shabalov, 4th in tiebreaks
 9th Wunsiedel Chess Festival, Germany – 1st place (2015)
 Liepājas Rokāde 2009, open tournament, Liepāja – 1st place (2009)
 Six times played for the national team of Latvia in the World Chess Olympiads (2000, 2006, 2012, 2014, 2016, 2018)
 Two times played for the national team of Latvia in European Team Chess Championships (1999, 2011)
Participant of FIDE Grand Swiss Tournament 2021

Coaching 
From 2010 to 2021, Arturs Neikšāns was the head coach at Riga Chess School, on a daily basis working with the most talented Latvian youngsters, among them Nikita Meshkovs, Toms Kantāns, Laura Rogule, Katrina Amerika (Skinke), Elizabete Limanovska, Dmitrijs Tokranovs and others. Many of them later would become grandmasters themselves and the core of the Latvian national team. He left the job in late October 2021 just before the start of FIDE Chess.com Grand Swiss.

Neiksans still does coaching, providing private lessons.

Author 
In 2018, Neiksans started a collaboration with one of the leading online chess education portals Modern Chess, producing four popular theoretical databases:

 Moscow Variation against the Sicilian – Complete Repertoire against 2...d6
 Rossolimo Variation against the Sicilian – Complete Repertoire against 2...Nc6
 Baltic variation against the Sicilian – Complete Repertoire against 2...e6 and sidelines
Positional Repertoire against the Caro-Kann
In late July 2021, Chessable published the first lesson course by Neiksans: Lifetime Repertoires – Reversed Sicilian, proving a complete repertoire for Black against the English Opening.

Commentary and streaming 
In parallel to other activities, Neiksans has also become a chess commentator for high-level international tournaments, both in English and Russian languages:

 ACP Cup (2013)
 Latvian Railway Open (2014)
 European Individual Women Championship (2017)
 FIDE World Chess Grand Prix, Riga stage (2019)
Biel International Chess Festival (2021)
RTU Open 2021
 FIDE World Chess Grand Prix, Berlin stage (2022)
Since April 2020, Arturs Neikšāns has also become a streamer on Twitch, regularly streaming several times a week.

References

External links
 
 
 
 

1983 births
Living people
Latvian chess players
Chess Olympiad competitors
Chess grandmasters
People from Valka
Twitch (service) streamers